Samuel Krislov ( 5 October 1929, Cleveland ) is Professor of Political Science and Law at the University of Minnesota.

Son Isaak Krislov and Gertrude Hutner. He received his B.A. and M.A. from New York University and his Ph.D. from Princeton University.

His areas of interest include comparative politics, governance, the Supreme Court, the political process, and Israeli courts, politics and society.

He has also been president of the Law and Society Association and the Midwest Political Science Association.

External links
Official page at University of Minnesota.

New York University alumni
Princeton University alumni
American political scientists
1929 births
Living people